James O'Reilly (October 10, 1855—December 19, 1934) was an Irish-born prelate of the Roman Catholic Church.  He served as  the second bishop of the Diocese of Fargo from 1910 until his death in1934.

Biography

Early life 
James O'Reilly was born in Lisgrea, County Cavan Ireland on June 24 1882. He was educated at All Hallows College in Dublin

O'Reilly was ordained to the priesthood on June 24, 1882 for the Archdiocese of St. Paul.  After his ordination, he served as pastor in parishes in Belle Creek, Lake City and Stillwater, Minnesota. In 1886, O'Reilly was appointed pastor of St. Anthony of Padua Parish in Minneapolis.

Bishop of Fargo 
On December 18, 1909, O'Reilly was appointed the second bishop of the Diocese of Fargo by Pope Pius X. He received his episcopal consecration on May 19, 1910, from Archbishop John Ireland, with Bishops James McGolrick and James Trobec serving as co-consecrators. 

James O'Reilly died on December 19, 1934 at age 79.

References

1855 births
1934 deaths
Irish expatriate Catholic bishops
Irish emigrants to the United States (before 1923)
People from County Cavan
20th-century Roman Catholic bishops in the United States
Alumni of All Hallows College, Dublin
Roman Catholic Archdiocese of Saint Paul and Minneapolis
Roman Catholic bishops of Fargo
Religious leaders from Minnesota